Stuck on You may refer to:

In film and television:
 Stuck on You!, a 1982 comedy film by Troma
 Stuck on You (film), a 2003 comedy by the Farrelly brothers
 "Stuck on You" (CSI: NY), an episode of the TV series CSI: NY
 "Stuck on You", a Thomas and Friends Season 15 episode starring Butch the Breakdown Lorry

In music:
 "Stuck on You" (Elvis Presley song)
 "Stuck on You" (Lionel Richie song), also covered by 3T
 "Stuck on You" (Yuna Ito song)
 "Stuck on You" (Failure song), also covered by Paramore.
 "Stuck on You", a song by Meiko from The Bright Side
 Stuck on You (album), an album by Bobby Caldwell